Paul Antoine Nassif (born February 21, 1969 in Beirut,  Lebanon) is the current Syriac Catholic Exarch of Canada.

Life

Antoine Nassif received on 26 July 1992 by the Syriac Catholic Patriarch of Antioch, Ignatius Antony II Hayyek, the sacrament of Holy orders.

On January 7, 2016 Pope Francis appointed him titular bishop of Serigene and ordered him the first Syriac Catholic Exarch of Canada. The Syriac Catholic Patriarch of Antioch, Ignatius Joseph III Yonan, on 23 January of the same year, gave him his episcopal consecration; his co-consecrators were the Emeritus Curial Archbishop in the Syriac Catholic Patriarchate of Antioch, Denys Raboula Antoine Beylouni, and the bishop of the Eparchy of Our Lady of Deliverance of Newark, Yousif Benham Habash.

References

External links
http://www.catholic-hierarchy.org/bishop/bnassif.html

1969 births
Lebanese Eastern Catholics
Living people
Religious leaders from Beirut
Syriac Catholic bishops
21st-century Roman Catholic titular bishops